Borxleben is a village in the district Kyffhäuserkreis, in Thuringia, Germany.

History
Between 30 June 1994 and 1 January 2019, Borxleben was part of the Mittelzentrum Artern collective municipality.

Population 
As of 31 December each year:

Source: Thuringian State Statistical Bureau

References

Municipalities in Thuringia
Kyffhäuserkreis
Schwarzburg-Rudolstadt